USCGC Blue Shark (WPB-87360) is an  long Marine Protector-class coastal patrol boat of the United States Coast Guard built by Bollinger Shipyards in Lockport, Louisiana.

History
Blue Shark, one of the newest cutters in the U.S. Coast Guard's fleet, is homeported at Everett, Washington and her primary missions are ports, waterways and coastal security, search and rescue, law enforcement, marine environmental response, recreational boating safety and military readiness.

See also
 List of United States Coast Guard cutters

References

External links

 

Marine Protector-class coastal patrol boats
Patrol vessels of the United States
Ships of the United States Coast Guard
Ships built in Lockport, Louisiana
2005 ships